Si Saowaphak or Sanphet IV (r. 1610/11–1611) was a short-reigning king of Ayutthaya of the Sukhothai dynasty in 1610/11. Prince Si Saowaphak was the son of Ekathotsarot and had an elder brother Prince Suthat who was made the Uparaja in 1607 but died before his father. Prince Si Saowaphak, as his father's second son, was expected to be invested the title of Crown Prince. However, Ekathotsarot never appointed him Maha Uparat.

When Ekathotsarot died in 1610/11, Prince Si Saowaphak succeeded his father on the throne. Si Saowaphak was said to be without ability. In the same year the Japanese traders entered the palace, and held Si Saowaphak hostage until he vowed not to hurt any Japanese people.  The Japanese then took the Sankharat (Supreme Patriarch) hostage to the mouth of Chao Phraya where they left for Japan.

Not long afterwards Si Saowaphak was murdered. The throne was given to Phra Ekathotsarot's son from a first class concubine, Phra Intharacha, who had been in the priesthood for 8 years. He assumed the title Phrachao Songtham.

Ancestry

References

1620 deaths
Sukhothai dynasty
Kings of Ayutthaya
Year of birth unknown
17th-century monarchs in Asia
17th-century murdered monarchs
Executed Thai monarchs
Thai male Chao Fa
Princes of Ayutthaya
17th-century Thai people